The Monk with the Whip (German: Der Mönch mit der Peitsche) is a 1967 West German mystery thriller film directed by Alfred Vohrer and starring Joachim Fuchsberger, Uschi Glas and Grit Boettcher. It is inspired by the 1926 novel The Black Abbot and subsequent 1927 play The Terror by Edgar Wallace which also served as the basis for the 1965 film The Sinister Monk. It was made as part of a long-running series of film adaptations of his work produced by Rialto Film.

The film's sets were designed by the art director Walter Kutz and Wilhelm Vorwerg. It was shot at the Spandau Studios and on location in West Berlin.

The film was released in the U.S. as The College Girl Murders.

Cast

References

Bibliography 
 Bergfelder, Tim. International Adventures: German Popular Cinema and European Co-Productions in the 1960s. Berghahn Books, 2005.
 Pitts, Michael R. Thrills Untapped: Neglected Horror, Science Fiction and Fantasy Films, 1928-1936. McFarland, 2018.

External links 
 

1967 films
1960s mystery thriller films
German mystery thriller films
West German films
1960s German-language films
Films directed by Alfred Vohrer
Constantin Film films
Films set in England
Films set in London
Films based on British novels
Films based on works by Edgar Wallace
Films shot in Berlin
Films shot at Spandau Studios
1960s German films